Neuter is a Latin adjective meaning "neither", and can refer to:

Neuter gender, a grammatical gender, a linguistic class of nouns triggering specific types of inflections in associated words
Neuter pronoun
Neutering, the sterilization of an animal

See also
Trap–neuter–return (TNR), an alternative to euthanasia for managing feral cat and dog populations
UCAN Spay Neuter Clinic, non-profit organization providing spay/neuter as a solution to pet overpopulation
Neuters, a musical album
Neuter whose
Neutra, a surname
Neutral (disambiguation)
Neutrino, a nearly massless, electrically neutral subatomic particle
Neutrogena, a line of cosmetic products
Neutron, an electrically neutral subatomic particle 
Jimmy Neutron, a cartoon series
Nutter (disambiguation)